Now and Forever is a romance novel, written by American Danielle Steel and published on 1978 by Dell Publishing. It is Steel's third novel.

Plot summary
Although Jessica and Ian Clarke have been married for seven years, they insist that the thrill and excitement have not dimmed. At Jessica's urging, Ian has left his advertising job to become a struggling writer, and she supports him with her successful San  Francisco boutique.

Ian's financial dependence on Jessica upsets him more than he admits and, in a moment of bored malaise, Ian's first casual indiscretion will create a nightmare that threatens everything Jessica and Ian have carefully built. What he does changes their lives, and them,  perhaps forever, as they struggle to pay the price for his mistake.

Characters
Jessica Clarke
Ian Clarke
Jake 
Lady J

References

External links
Google Books: Now And Forever plot synopsis and book information. Retrieved on 14 December 2007.

1978 American novels
American romance novels
Contemporary romance novels
Chick lit novels
Novels by Danielle Steel
Novels set in San Francisco
Dell Publishing books